Conglomerates Collide is a 1981 video game published by RockRoy for the Apple II.

Gameplay
In Conglomerates Collide, the player is the president of a company.

Reception
Bob Proctor reviewed the game for Computer Gaming World, and stated that "Conglomerates Collide is only moderately interesting. It does have flashy graphics but these are not important to the play of the game."

References

External links
1984 Software Encyclopedia from Electronic Games
Review in Softalk
Review in Family Computing

1981 video games
Apple II games
Apple II-only games
Business simulation games
Video games developed in the United States